Winwick is a village and civil parish in the Borough of Warrington, Cheshire, England. Located within the historic boundaries of Lancashire, it is situated about three miles north of Warrington town centre, nearby is junction 22 of the M6 and Junction 9 of the M62. Winwick also borders Newton-le-Willows and Burtonwood.

According to the 2001 Census, the civil parish had a population of 4,366.

History

King Oswald of Northumbria is believed to have been killed in the Winwick area and the parish church, dedicated to him, was reputedly located with guidance from the "Winwick Pig", a carving of which can still be seen on the church wall. Richard Sherlock was the incumbent at Winwick for some thirty years in the seventeenth century, and Thomas Wilson, Bishop of Sodor and Man, spent his early years in the care of Sherlock at Winwick.

At the time of the Domesday Survey (1086), the village itself was also known as St. Oswalds. This was little more than four hundred years after the death of St. Oswald. In the church, the remains of a 7th-century stone cross with an engraving of the reputed demise of Oswald can be seen.

Winwick was the site of the battle of Winwick in the second English Civil War on 19 August 1648, where Oliver Cromwell defeated a mainly Scottish royalist army.

The Captain of the RMS Titanic, Edward Smith, married Sarah Eleanor Pennington on 13 January 1887 at St. Oswald's Church.

Rail crash 

In 1934, Winwick was the site of an accident in which 11 people were killed and 19 people were injured. Another accident occurred in 1967, but there were no fatalities or serious injuries.

Winwick today
Although Winwick is next to two motorways, it remains a relatively compact village set in a rural location. The village also includes a council estate and Winwick Park, with houses ranging from £200,000 to £500,000. Winwick previously had a post office and currently has a community leisure centre, a pub (The Swan), a beauty salon, a hairdressers, Ashton's estate agency as well as "Thorougoods", a partner store of Bargain Booze. It is also home to a car boot sale site located on green belt land that also occasionally hosts a circus and touring fair.

Winwick Hospital, a large Victorian mental asylum, closed down in 1997. A smaller hospital called Hollins Park is currently situated on the site: Hollins Park Hospital is also the headquarters for North West Boroughs Healthcare NHS Foundation Trust.

Winwick has a major business park and industrial estate, Winwick Quay Business Park, located on Calver Road just off the main A49.

Sport
Winwick Athletic F.C. is a junior football club that has become a very well known and highly successful, initially as an FA Charter Standard Development Club from 2006 (in fact winning the Lancashire County and North West Regional Awards in 2007, 2009 and 2011 as well as then also winning the prestigious FA Charter Standard National Club of the Year Award in 2009). In January 2013 Winwick Athletic F.C. became an FA Charter Standard Community Club, which is the highest level possible as an FA Grassroots Football Club, and now, as of 1 June 2014, has become a Nike Partner Club.

See also

 Listed buildings in Winwick, Cheshire
 St Oswald's Church, Winwick

References

External links

 "Winwick Pig"
 Parkside Action Group
 Winwick Hospital
 Winwick Quay Business Park
 Winwick Athletic FC
 Ashtons Winwick

Villages in Cheshire
Warrington
Civil parishes in Warrington